Fei Fu Kwan Ying, also known by its alternative title Flying Squads, is a 1989 Hong Kong action crime thriller television series produced by TVB and starring Donnie Yen, Pauline Yeung and Eddie Kwan. Originally aired from 7 to 25 August 1989 on TVB Jade, the series reran on TVB's Network Vision channel from 11 to 29 January 2016 on weekends as a part of the special, Our... Donnie Yen (我們的...甄子丹), which began running on the same day.

Plot
Cheung Ho-nam (Donnie Yen), Lau Chuen-hang (Eddie Kwan) and Cheng Sing (Oscar Lam) are three best friends. Ho-nam and Sing later joined the Special Duties Unit of the Hong Kong Police Force while Cheun-hang inherit his father's triad business. Although on opposite sides of the law, they were able to accommodate each other due to their strong friendship. Chuen-hang's younger sister, Chun-fong (Anita Lee), has a crush on Ho-nam, however, Ho-nam is dating fellow police officer, Kei-kei (Pauline Yeung). Feeling broken-hearted, Chuen-fong marries Sing, who had been secretly admiring her. When Chuen-hang first go involved in the underworld, he was tricked by the elders. With the support and encouragement of his confidante, Anita (Mimi Kung), Chuen-hang finally eliminated dissidents and his influence gradually expands. Chuen-hang becomes a triad leader and his friendship with Ho-nam shatters. Ho-nam has vowed to bring Chuen-hang to justice. Later on, Chuen-hang causes the deaths of Sing, Anita, Chuen-fong and Ho-nam's older sister, Ng (Angelina Lo), leading to a tense and brutal battle between Ho-nam and Chuen-hang.

Cast
Donnie Yen as Cheung Ho-nam (張皓南)
Pauline Yeung as Lei Kei-kei (利琪琪)
Eddie Kwan as Lau Chuen-hang (劉傳亨)
Anita Lee as Lau Chuen-fong (劉傳芳)
Oscar Lam as Cheng Sing (鄭勝)
Mimi Kung as Anita
Angelina Lo as Cheung Ng (張五)
Tam Hing-chuen as Lau Kuen (劉權)
Leung Oi
Alan Chan
Tang Yu-chiu
Ng Pok-kwan
Chan Yuk-lun
Cheng Ka-sang
Leung Siu-chau
Wong Wai-tak
Sher Ng
Kei Siu-kei
Bak Man-biu
Wong Hung-kam
Ng Wah-san
Chan Kwok-chi
Wong Yat-fei
To Siu-chun
Luk Ying-hong
Lai Koon-sing
Kong Ning
Cheng Kwan-chik
Yau Kwok-leung
Karel Wong
Raymond Tsang
Ma Chung-tak
Tsui Kwong-lam
Chan Kwan-kai
Lam Chung
Wayne Lai
Ng Sui-ting
Chan Chung-kin
Clement Poon
Yeung Chung-yee
Law Kwok-wai
Gilbert Lam
Tsang Yiu-ming
Wong Yan-chi
Wong Sing-seung
Lam Kin-fai
Evergreen Mak
Chu Tit-wo
Tam Siu-ming
Hui Sat-yin
Gregory Charles Rivers
Suen Kwai-hing
Frankie Lam
Leung Kin-ping
Wong Sze-yan
Tam Yat-ching
Ling Hon
Cho Chai
Yip Sai-kuen
Ho Pik-kin
Bobby Au-yeung
Lee Wong-sang
Fung Kwok
Gordon Lam
Sing Yan
Law Shu-kei
Chan Fung-ping
Sin Po-wah
Ho Lai-nam
Tang Yee-ho
Kenny Wong
Mak Chi-wan
Sin Kim-yuen
Ben Wong
Wong Ying-kuen

See also
Donnie Yen filmography
List of TVB series (1989)

References

External links
Fe Fu Kwan Ying at MyTV
Fei Fu Kwan Ying at DonnieYen.asia

TVB dramas
1989 Hong Kong television series debuts
1989 Hong Kong television series endings
Hong Kong action television series
Hong Kong crime television series
Martial arts television series
1980s Hong Kong television series
Cantonese-language television shows